The men's individual all-around, also known as the heptathlon, was one of two gymnastics events on the Gymnastics at the 1908 Summer Olympics programme. As suggested by the alternate name, the competition included seven events with the scores summed to give a final score. Each nation could enter up to 20 gymnasts, with France and Great Britain each entering the maximum. A total of 97 gymnasts from 12 nations competed. The event was won by Alberto Braglia of Italy, the nation's first medal in the men's individual all-around. Silver went to Walter Tysall of Great Britain, the first medal for the nation as well. France's Louis Ségura earned bronze.

Unlike in 1904, the results for the individual all-around were not used for the men's team event in 1908.

Background

This was the third appearance of the men's individual all-around. The first individual all-around competition had been held in 1900, after the 1896 competitions featured only individual apparatus events. A men's individual all-around has been held every Games since 1900.

One of the top 10 gymnasts from the 1904 Games returned: silver medalist Wilhelm Weber of Germany. The reigning (1907) World Champion was Josef Čada of Bohemia.

Canada, Finland, the Netherlands, Norway, and Turkey each made their debut in the event. Germany made its third appearance, the only nation to have competed at all editions of the event to that point.

Competition format

The events were:
 Horizontal bar, swinging movements
 Horizontal bar, slow movements
 Parallel bars
 Rings, swinging
 Rings, stationary
 Pommel horse
 Rope climbing

With the exception of rope climbing, each competitor had a maximum of 2 minutes in each event (with a one-point penalty for exceeding the limit). Horizontal bars were set at heights of 250 cm and 220 cm; parallel bars were set at heights of 160 cm and 148 cm; rings were adjustable in 10 cm increments from 180 cm to 250 cm. The rope, which was 5 cm in diameter, had a top mark at 720 cm and marks below that every 45 cm down to 180 cm.

Other than for rope climbing, each gymnast performed one "voluntary" exercise on each apparatus, with a maximum score of 24 points from each of the 3 judges. Thus, there was a maximum of 72 points per exercise or 432 points from the six non-rope climbing exercises. Points were awarded for "(a) successful performance of exercise attempted; (b) difficulty and combination of movements; (c) style and sequence; (d) variety of movements."

The rope climbing competition required gymnasts to climb hand-over-hand, with legs together and clear of the rope. Gymnasts had to climb in continuous motion; the judging ended when motion ceased to be continuous. The gymnast earned  point for every 18 inches climbed.

Schedule

Results

The Official Report gives the places and scores of the first 19. A full list of results was printed in a French journal in August 1908, but was not discovered until March 2020.

References

Sources
 
 

Men's all-around